Jaap J. Vermeulen (born 1955) is a Dutch botanist, specializing in the Orchidaceae genus Bulbophyllum.

Publications by Jaap Vermeulen

Books

Bulbophyllum of Sulawesi

Orchids of Borneo Volume 2 Bulbophyllum

BULBOPHYLLUM OF BORNEO

Multi-media

Non-refereed Articles:

Newsletters:

Book Reviews:

Popular Articles:

Further reading
Publications of Jaap Vermeuen*

References

Academic staff of Leiden University
Living people
20th-century Dutch botanists
21st-century Dutch botanists
1955 births